María Carrasco (born July 15, 1995) is a Spanish singer.

Her biggest success to date came with the debut album Hablando con la Luna, which she released at the age of 11. It hit number seven in the Spanish charts. The album featured her debut single "Abuelo" ("Grandfather").

Discography

Studio albums

References

External links 
 
 
 Selected music videos
  (María Carrasco's debut single, 2006)
  (2007)

1995 births
Living people
Flamenco singers
Spanish child singers
People from Jerez de la Frontera
Singers from Andalusia
21st-century Spanish singers
21st-century Spanish women singers